Nelson González (born September 22, 1988 in Berazategui, Buenos Aires), is an Argentine footballer who currently plays for Sportivo Patria in Argentina.

Career
González began his professional career with Quilmes in 2008, making his debut on May 3, 2008, his only appearance of the team's 2007/08 season. He played nine games for El Cervecero in their 2008/09 campaign before making a move on loan to Major League Soccer side Real Salt Lake in July, 2009.

González remained with Real Salt Lake through the 2011 season. At season's end, the club declined his 2012 contract option and he entered the 2011 MLS Re-Entry Draft. He was not selected in the draft and became a free agent in MLS.

In August 2012, he signed a new contract with Uruguayan side C.A. Bella Vista.

On 29 June 2013, he signed a contract with Cypriot side AEK Kouklia.

References

External links
 
 

1988 births
Living people
Argentine footballers
Argentine expatriate footballers
Quilmes Atlético Club footballers
Real Salt Lake players
C.A. Bella Vista players
AEK Kouklia F.C. players
Major League Soccer players
Cypriot First Division players
Expatriate soccer players in the United States
Expatriate footballers in Uruguay
Argentine expatriate sportspeople in the United States
Expatriate footballers in Cyprus
Association football midfielders
People from Berazategui Partido
Sportspeople from Buenos Aires Province